Brad vs Satchel is a compilation album of unreleased and incomplete tracks by the American rock bands Brad and Satchel. It was released on July 26, 2005 through The Establishment Store.

Overview 
Brad and Satchel share three of the same band members. Satchel has been folded into Brad, and other than on special occasions, does not perform or record as Satchel any longer. The tracks performed by Brad on this release were recorded during the recording sessions for the band's third studio album, Welcome to Discovery Park. Greg Prato of Allmusic said, "For hardcore fans, Brad vs Satchel will be of interest. But if you're a casual fan, you'd probably be better off sticking with the studio albums by each group."

Track listing 
All songs written by Mike Berg, Stone Gossard, Regan Hagar, and Shawn Smith, except where noted:

Recorded in 1997 by Satchel:
 "Looking Forward" (Berg, Hagar, Smith) – 4:50
 "Peace & Quiet" (Berg, Hagar, Smith) – 5:30
 "Takin' It Back" (Berg, Hagar, Smith) – 3:47
Recorded in 2001 by Brad:
 "Roll Over" – 3:23
Recorded in 1997 by Satchel:
 "Whose Side Are You On" (Berg, Hagar, Smith) – 5:28
Recorded in 2001 by Brad:
 "I Don't Know If...You'll" – 4:44
 "3 O'Clock" – 2:53
 "Summertime Song" – 3:14
 "I Must Confess" – 5:09
 "Awake" – 4:54
 "Playground" – 6:23

Personnel 
Brad
 Mike Berg – bass guitar, engineering
 Stone Gossard – guitar, engineering
 Regan Hagar – drums, engineering, design, photography, layout design, photo design, photo illustration
 Shawn Smith – keyboards, vocals
 Jeremy Toback – bass guitar

Production
 Matt Bayles, Floyd Reitsman – engineering
 Ed Brooks – mastering

References 

2005 compilation albums
Brad (band) compilation albums
Split albums
Albums produced by Stone Gossard